Sun Daolin (December 18, 1921 – December 28, 2007) was a Chinese actor and film director.

Biography
Sun Daolin was born in Beijing on November 18, 1921. He was born Sun Yiliang 孙以亮 into a family of four children. His father Sun Wenyao (孫文耀) was trained as railroad engineer in Brussels, Belgium. His mother Fan Nianhua (范念华) and father both are originally from Jiashan County, Zhejiang. He along with all his siblings learned to speak English since grade school. He attended Yenching University, but his studies in philosophy were interrupted by the Second Sino-Japanese War. During the war he was active in patriotic activities including stage acting and he was jailed briefly by the Japanese Puppet Regime. After the war, he completed his studies and received a degree in philosophy in 1947.

His career had spanned much of the PRC history. One of his earliest roles was in director Zheng Junli’s Crows and Sparrows, a polemic on the corruption of the Nationalist Government just prior to their defeat in the Chinese Civil War. After 1949, Sun continued to act, notably as the eldest brother in an adaptation of Ba Jin’s novel, Family.

Sun Daolin is one of the most famous actors for the 1950-70's movie goer generations in China. Some four decades ago, to many Chinese, he was an idol and perfect Mr. Right for all unmarried women at his time.

In the 1980s, Sun began to focus increasing energy on directing. In 1983, he wrote, directed and starred in the well-received Thunderstorm, based on the play by Cao Yu. His second try behind the camera was 1992’s The Stepmother. After his semi-retirement he was active in poetry, Hamlet, Schubert songs. He was at several international film festivals and as late as the 1990s.

Sun died in Shanghai on December 28, 2007 at the age of 86. At his service 1,000s of fans paid the last respect. He is survived by his wife Wang Wenjuan, a Yue opera actress and a daughter Sun Qingyuan (孫慶原), one grand child. Wang was best known for her performance in "The Dream of the Red Chamber".

Selected filmography

As actor

As director

Notes

References
 Li, Na and Qian Na.  Biography of Sun Daolin (In Chinese)  (Shanghai People's Press, 2009 )

External links

Sun Daolin at the BFI Film and TV database
Sun Daolin at the Chinese Movie Database
Sun Daolin dies - revered Chinese actor, director San Francisco Chronicle January 5, 2008

1921 births
2007 deaths
Film directors from Beijing
Male actors from Beijing
Yenching University alumni
Chinese male voice actors
Chinese male film actors
Chinese male television actors